Klub osnovan 1962. godine, takmiči se u Drugoj kantonalnoj ligi TK - Sjever.
 Prije desetak godina, Mladost je igrala Drugu ligu FBiH - Sjever.
 Ispadanjem iz nje u sezoni 2011/12, nastupio je turbulentan period za njih.
 Imali su i periode neaktivnosti. 
U sezoni 2018/19 su igrali Prvu kantonalnu ligu TK, da bi nakon toga doživjeli dva uzastopna ispadanja. 
Prošle sezone su uspjeli da obezbijede povratak u rang iznad, osvojivši drugo mjesto u Trećoj kantonalnoj ligi TK - Zapad,te su nakon 5 godina osvojili trofej KUP-a grada Srebrenika. 
Ligu su na kraju završile samo tri ekipe. 
Trenutno, ljudi okupljeni oko kluba vrijedno rade u nastojanjima da ga približe onom što je nekada bio.

Web site

Football clubs in Bosnia and Herzegovina